Vatel is a 2000 historical drama film directed by Roland Joffé, written by Jeanne Labrune and translated by Tom Stoppard, and starring Gérard Depardieu, Uma Thurman, Tim Roth, Timothy Spall, Julian Glover and Julian Sands. The film, based on the life of 17th-century French chef François Vatel, was nominated for an Academy Award for Best Art Direction. The film opened the 2000 Cannes Film Festival.

Plot 
The story takes place in 1671. In the context of the Franco-Dutch War, a financially struggling Louis, Grand Condé is visited by King Louis XIV for three days of festivities at the Château de Chantilly. The prince wants a commission as a general, and spares no expense in order to impress the king. In charge of organizing the event is François Vatel, Master of Festivities and Pleasures in the prince's household. Vatel is a man of great honor and talent, but of low birth. As the great Condé is prepared to do anything in his quest for stature, the tasks assigned to Vatel are often menial and dishonourable. While Vatel tries to maintain his dignity amidst the extravaganza he is meant to orchestrate, he finds himself in love with Anne de Montausier, the king's latest lover, who returns his affections. However, due to their incompatible social standing and the rigid hierarchy of the court, continuing the liaison is clearly impossible.

In the last day of the king's visit, Vatel realizes that he is nothing more than a puppet in the hands of his superiors, bought and sold like a piece of property, after learning that the Prince of Condé has "lost" him in a card game with the king. Disheartened and refusing to leave his people (the servants of the Château) and go to work for the king, Vatel commits suicide by throwing himself on his sword. Nevertheless, the king is told by his own court members that Vatel killed himself because the roast was not sufficient to feed several unexpected guests, the clouds dulled the fireworks display and he lacked confidence that there would be enough fish for the morning meal. This explanation pleases the king very much. Anne de Montausier is grief-stricken upon hearing the news, but knows she must not speak of it. She leaves the court quietly, and no one ever hears about her and Vatel again.

Cast

Reception 
Rotten Tomatoes, a review aggregator, reports that 31% of 32 surveyed critics gave the film a positive review; the average rating is 4.6/10.  The site's consensus reads: "Visually sumptuous, but unengaging." Metacritic rated it 44/100 based on 13 reviews, indicating "mixed or average reviews". David Stratton of Variety wrote, "Vatel, a no-expense-spared costumer, is further proof that all the money and technical expertise in the world are no substitutes for a good screenplay and creative direction." Elvis Mitchell of The New York Times called the film "a costume drama with far more costumes than drama". Kevin Thomas of the Los Angeles Times called it "a timeless tale of love and sacrifice in a world as opulent as it is cruel."

References

External links 
 
 

2000 films
2000 romantic drama films
British romantic drama films
British biographical drama films
French biographical drama films
Romantic period films
Cooking films
France in fiction
Films about Louis XIV
Films set in the 1670s
Fictional chefs
Films directed by Roland Joffé
Films set in France
Films scored by Ennio Morricone
Films set in country houses
English-language French films
Films about chefs
Cultural depictions of cooks
Cultural depictions of Jean-Baptiste Colbert
2000s English-language films
2000s British films
2000s French films